Gallicanus may refer to:
Gaius Cornelius Gallicanus, Roman consul in 84 AD
Ovinius Gallicanus, Roman consul in 317 AD
Flavius Gallicanus, Roman consul in 330 AD
Saint Gallicanus (fl. 363 AD), legendary saint, perhaps a composite of the above
Gallicanus I, bishop of Embrun (fl. 524–29 AD)
Gallicanus II, bishop of Embrun (fl. 541–49 AD)

fr:Gallican